The Panoz DP01 is an open-wheel car that was produced by Élan Motorsport Technologies at Braselton, Georgia, United States. It was developed for use in the 2007 Champ Car World Series season, replacing the aging de facto-spec Lola chassis. The DP01 was introduced to the world at the 2006 Grand Prix of San Jose on July 28, 2006. Due to the February 2008 sale of Champ Car to the Indy Racing League, which uses its own spec equipment, the car is not currently used in a professional racing series in the United States. The final race for the car was the 2008 Grand Prix of Long Beach.

Development concepts

The Panoz DP01 was developed to be safer, and less aero-dependent while racing closely with other cars than previously existing Champ Cars. The Panoz had numerous changes from the previous Lola car, including more downforce from the underbody. Approximately 60% of the car's  of downforce at  came from the bottom of the car. It weighed about 1,550 lbs., and featured a 950-horsepower Cosworth XFE 2.65-liter turbocharged V8. The DP01 could go from 0-60 mph in 2.2 seconds, 0-100 mph in 4.2 seconds, and had an approximate top speed of 240 mph. This was done by directing the air in a way so as to create additional downforce on the car, thereby effectively sucking it to the racetrack. This put less dependency on the front and rear wings in the event of a failure at high speed.

Another major change from the previous car was the raised nose, which was moved farther above the front wing and directing more air to the underbody aerodynamics. The raised nose also created a safer environment for the driver in the event of a head-on collision with a wall or another car.

The driver sat more upright than in the Lola chassis, to reduce the chances of back injuries, and to better accommodate the use of the HANS device.

Champ Car used the 2.65L 90° 8-cylinder turbocharged Cosworth XFE as the exclusive engine during the 2007 season.

Unveiling
The DP01 was officially unveiled to the public at the Champ Car Grand Prix of Road America on September 24, 2006. Brazilian Roberto Moreno piloted the DP01 at the unveiling, putting down a few demonstration laps shortly before the feature Champ Car race that day.

Debut
The first Champ Car open test of the DP01 took place January 23 to January 25, 2007, at Sebring International Raceway.  The second open test occurred on February 12 and 13 at MSR Houston. The third and last open test before the season took place March 9 and 10 at Mazda Raceway Laguna Seca.  The Panoz DP01's race debut was at the Vegas Grand Prix on April 8, 2007. Team Australia's Will Power won the inaugural pole and the first race with the DP01.

Final Champ Car DP01 race
In February 2008, the sale of Champ Car to the Indy Racing League (IRL) was consummated. Since the IRL used its own spec formula based around a chassis made by Italian manufacturer Dallara, the DP01 was retired from championship racing after approximately one year of racing service.  The 2008 Grand Prix of Long Beach held in April 2008 served as a "Champ Car finale", and the DP01s were used by all participants.

Current status

The Panoz DP01 is no longer being manufactured. However, Elan Motorsports Technologies did use the car as somewhat of a model for the Panoz DP09 chassis for the Superleague Formula series that houses a naturally aspirated Menard 4.2 V12 engine.

DP01s owned by most Champ Car teams were sold to privateers in the United States and elsewhere. Two examples of the cars in use during 2010 were in the BOSS GP Series, where the chassis was campaigned by Henk de Boer and by Peter Milavec.

Atlantic Championship former president Ben Johnston also owned multiple DP01s, which he intended to be raced in a new multi-class open-wheel racing series called GreenPrixUSA. However, the series was delayed due to track and possible engine issues. As of 2016, Johnston was forced to liquidate his racing assets due to divorce.

Complete IndyCar Series results
(key)

 Non-points-paying, exhibition race.

References
Information for this article was found in the October 2006 issue of Race Tech Magazine.

External links
 2007 Panoz DP01 Champ Car

DP01
American Championship racing cars